Muxta is a genus of moths in the subfamily Arctiinae. It contains the single species Muxta xanthopa, which is found in Cameroon, the Democratic Republic of Congo, Gabon, Ghana, Kenya, Liberia, Nigeria and Uganda.

References

Natural History Museum Lepidoptera generic names catalog

Lithosiini